The Rural Municipality of Coulee No. 136 is a rural municipality (RM) in the Canadian province of Saskatchewan within Census Division No. 7 and  Division No. 3. The RM is located in the southwest portion of the province, southeast of the City of Swift Current.

History 
The RM of Coulee No. 136 incorporated as a rural municipality on December 12, 1910.

Geography

Communities and localities 
The following unincorporated communities are within the RM.

Organized hamlets
Chortitz

Localities
Braddock
Burnham
Hallonquist
McMahon
Neidpath
Rheinfeld
Rosenhof
Rosenort
South Gnadenthal

Demographics 

Government 
The RM of Coulee No. 136 is governed by an elected municipal council and an appointed administrator that meets on the second Wednesday of every month. The reeve of the RM is Greg Targerson while its administrator is Tammy Knight. The RM's office is located in Swift Current.

See also 
List of rural municipalities in Saskatchewan

References 

C